The colonial roots of gender inequality refers to the political, educational, and economic inequalities between men and women in Africa. According to a Global Gender Gap Index report published  in 2018, it would take 135 years to close the gender gap in Africa and nearly 153 years to close the gap in North Africa. There are competing theories about the cause of gender inequality in Africa, but scholars suggest its genesis is in slavery and colonialism.

History 
Scholars point to the colonial legacy of African underdevelopment to explain gender inequality and female disempowerment. When Europeans settled in Uganda it caused a century-long transformation of Kampala which led to a gender Kuznets curve. African men were educated and employed in the white-collar (high-status) economy built by the Europeans. Women, on the other hand, were slower to obtain education and employment in the white-collared economy. This disparity contributed to the gender inequality gap in the early pre-colonial period, however, the gender gap gradually decreased during the late colonial era. Economist believed the gender gap may have been rooted in indigenous social norms. Less-educated women often worked in traditional informal economies rather than formal work. Consequently, they were subjected to marital gender inequality in comparison to women who worked in the formal economies created by Europeans.

Literature often characterized African women as subservient to their fathers and husbands. But in pre-colonial Africa, women were queen-mothers, queen-sisters; princesses, chiefs and holders of offices and villages, occasional warriors, and in one well known case, the Lovedu, the supreme monarch.

Women in post-colonial Africa, on the other hand, were not always protected from certain abuses because they no longer held societal or political power. Many scholars believe African women became virtually voiceless, unable to gain economic and educational equality.

Gender Roles in Pre-colonial and Post-colonial Africa 
Women in all of pre-colonial Africa held positions of prominence and dignity. They played critical roles socially and economically, and contributed to the family by processing food, weaving, making pottery, and cooking. African households were ruled by a patrilineal system where men were the heads of the household and women managed the younger family members. Most commonly outside of the home many women were involved in trade. Yoruban women, for example, were the central figures in long-distance trade. They amassed enormous wealth and held prominent titles. A successful Yoruba woman might hold the chieftaincy title of iyalode; which meant she had great privilege and power.

Pre-Colonial Africa 
In the pre-colonial era, women were also politically active. They governed the home; which was a very important role with significant power. Because power and privilege was based on age and gender, elder women had a voice in many important issues concerning the family and community. Private and public activities were so commingled that the power and privilege women held in the home was often mirrored in public. Some literature details how women used the production of food to gain respect, and in turn, they used that respect to dominate the children and influence the men in their lives. Religious women prayed to the gods and spirits for power and influence.  

Men controlled the activities outside of the household and could bestow titles on women. For example, queen-mother, a prestigious title among the Edo and Yoruba, could be given to the king's mother or another free woman with notable status. The queen mother officiated meetings and had subordinate title-holders assisting her. Some Yoruba and Hausa legends recall when women held the title of king. Legendary figures like Moremi of Ile-Ife, Amina of Zaria of Ondo, and Daura were notable queens.

Post-Colonial Africa 
In the 20th century, women lost their influence and power when patriarchy and colonialism changed gender relations. The role of female chiefs decreased as male chiefs negotiated with European colonial administrations in the oversight of taxes and governance. African men and European firms dominated the distribution of rubber, cocoa, groundnuts (peanuts), and palm oil, as the economy became more and more dependent on cash crops for exports. This pushed women into the background where they were forced into the informal economy. The custom land-tenure systems that once provided women with access to land was exchanged for land commercialization which favored those with access to wealth earned from the sale of cash crops. Moreover, the European-style education system in post-colonial Africa favored boys over girls.

Gender Inequalities in the 21st Century 
Analysts and scholars contend the global movements to improve the livelihood of women in the West, and those living in urban cities, have not benefitted women in Sub-Saharan Africa. To close the gender gap in Africa, the issues women face must become part of the global discussions. According to published reports, Sub-Saharan Africa is among the world's most gender-unequal regions. The United Nations Development Programme (UNDP), reports “perceptions, attitudes, and historic gender roles” prevent women from accessing health care and education and contributes to disproportionate levels of family responsibility, job segregation, and sexual violence.

Educational Inequalities 

Theoretically, the inequality between boys and girls starts in primary school and widens throughout the educational process. Over the past decade, Africa registered the highest relative increase in primary education in total enrollment among regions. Girls, however, were enrolled at lower rates. In 2000, Sub-Saharan Africa  reported 23 million girls were not enrolled in primary school, an increase of 3 million from a decade earlier when 20 million were not enrolled.

Policy reforms in countries such as Benin, Botswana, the Gambia, Guinea, Lesotho, Mauritania and Namibia made notable improvements in enrollment for girls. For example, in Benin, the gender gap decreased from 32% to 22% due to media campaigns that emphasized to parents the necessity of enrolling girls in primary school. Benin also reduced school fees for primary school aged girls living in rural areas.

According to the UN Educational, Scientific and Cultural Organization (UNESCO) the enrollment for girls enrolled increased relative to boys when the number of female teachers increased. UNESCO reported that an effective tool to close the gender parity was to balance gender among teachers. Mauritania employed this strategy to close the gender gap in primary schools from 13% to 4% between 1990 and 2000.

Guinea's strategy was to make girl's education a national priority. In the early 1990s, the government launched programs to build latrines, introduced reproductive care for pregnant students, distributed free textbooks, and increased the number of female teachers. By 2000, Guinea more than doubled the enrollment of girls in school and boys’ attendance increased by 80%. But regionally, Africa still has fewer female teachers, in general.

Between 1990 and 2000, adult literacy rates improved in Africa by 20%. The female illiteracy rates are much higher than the regional average; which is 50%. In Burkina Faso the female literacy is 82%, in Sierra Leone it is 79%, and in Benin and Ethiopia it is 77%.

Economic Inequalities 
Analysts believe the biggest obstacle to gender inequality in Africa is wealth accumulation. According to the World Bank, 37% of women in the region have a bank account, compared to 48% of men. These percentages are low for both genders but the gap has widened for women over the past several years

Access to wealth 
For women to escape poverty, analysts believe they need access to development policies that would place more emphasis on their contributions to the economy. Women contribute significantly to the population but their labour participation is not fully accounted for because it is often derived from informal agricultural farming. Similarly, any work inside the home is not accounted for because it is not considered to be an economic activity

At the macro level, gender inequality is also costly. The UNDP reports countries in Sub-Saharan Africa lose approximately $95 billion annually because women are not integrated into the national economy. When impoverished women are unable to contribute socially, economic growth is stagnated.

Some women farmers do have access to financial resources, leading analysts to conclude financial empowerment would increase female participation in community decision-making and combat social marginalization, which would improve the overall family's well-being. Case studies show women who manage household finances are less likely to have children die from malnutrition

According to the UNDP, one of the most significant changes needed would be commitments from financial institutions to offer products that meet the needs of women, which would give more women access to financial resources. By creating specific loan programs for crops that are traditionally grown by female farmers – such as groundnuts or sunflowers, financial institutions would encourage female leadership in farmers’ cooperatives, and support markets where women sell their harvests

At current rates of financial inclusion, it would take the world more than 200 years to achieve gender parity globally, but analysts believe if governments, international actors, and the financial industry devise and sustain more gender-focused policies, the gender inequality gap would shorten more quickly.

References 

Gender equality